Lazar Borisovich Zalkind (1886, in Kharkiv – 1945, in Komsomolsk-on-Amur) was a Jewish Ukrainian economist and chess problemist.

References

1886 births
1945 deaths
Writers from Kharkiv
People from Kharkov Governorate
Ukrainian Jews
Mensheviks
Ukrainian chess players
Jewish chess players
Jewish socialists
Chess composers
1931 Menshevik Trial
Russian Social Democratic Labour Party members